David William Harrison was an English professional football manager who coached French team Stade Reims between 1931 and 1934.

References

Year of birth missing
Year of death missing
English football managers